Amara hyperborea is a species of seed-eating ground beetle in the subfamily Harpalinae. It is found in northeastern China, southern Mongolia, as well as Finland, Canada and the United States.

References

Further reading

 
 
 

hyperborea
Beetles described in 1831
Taxa named by Pierre François Marie Auguste Dejean